Phillip's Field was a cricket ground in Bromley in Kent. The only recorded match on the ground was in 1840, when a Kent side played an England XI in the grounds only first-class cricket match.

The location of the ground today is roughly where St John's Church and Freelands Road are located.

References

Defunct cricket grounds in England
Cricket grounds in London
Cricket grounds in Kent
Defunct sports venues in London
Sport in the London Borough of Bromley
Sports venues completed in 1840